Perce Point is a low ice-covered headland 12 nautical miles (22 km) west-northwest of Berlioz Point on the southern coast of the Beethoven Peninsula, situated in the southwest portion of Alexander Island, Antarctica. The headland was first discovered by Snow, Perce and Carroll of the United States Antarctic Service (USAS) expedition in a flight from Stonington Island on December 22, 1940. Originally named "Cape Perce" after Earl B. Perce, co-pilot of the discovery aircraft, but the term point is considered appropriate for this feature.

See also

 Ablation Point
 Dykeman Point
 Mazza Point

Headlands of Alexander Island